Culture and Value is a selection from the personal notes of Ludwig Wittgenstein made by Georg Henrik von Wright. It was first published in German as Vermischte Bemerkungen in 1977 with the text being emended in following editions. Wright's second (1978) expanded edition was translated by Peter Winch and published in 1980 (and reprinted in 1984) as Culture and Value. Alois Pichler revised the work (producing a new German edition in 1994) and this was published with a new translation by Peter Winch in 1998.

The remarks are arranged in chronological order with an indication of their year of origin.  Nearly half of them stem from the period after the completion (in 1945) of Part One of Philosophical Investigations.

At the end of the book appears a poem which was offered by Wittgenstein to the Hofrat Ludwig Hänsel, and it is assumed that he was its author.

Among the published notes particular attention has been bestowed on a passage where Wittgenstein enumerated people who, in his judgement, had influenced him: Boltzmann, Hertz, Schopenhauer, Frege, Russell, Kraus, Loos, Weininger,  Spengler and Sraffa. Of note to literary scholars, the book also contains some of Wittgenstein's thoughts on Shakespeare, negatively comparing his depictions of character to those of Tolstoy.

A further note dating from the same year (1931) witnesses the first occurrence of the term 'family resemblance' in a discussion of Spengler's work.

References

External links 

Books by Ludwig Wittgenstein
Philosophy of religion literature